Allen Welsh Dulles (April 7, 1893 – January 29, 1969) was the first civilian director of central intelligence (DCI), and its longest-serving director to date. As head of the Central Intelligence Agency (CIA) during the early Cold War, he oversaw the 1953 Iranian coup d'état, the 1954 Guatemalan coup d'état, the Lockheed U-2 aircraft program, the Project MKUltra mind control program and the Bay of Pigs Invasion. He was fired by John F. Kennedy over the latter fiasco.

Dulles was one of the members of the Warren Commission investigating the assassination of John F. Kennedy. Between his stints of government service, Dulles was a corporate lawyer and partner at Sullivan & Cromwell. His older brother, John Foster Dulles, was the secretary of state during the Eisenhower administration and is the namesake of Dulles International Airport.

Early life and family 
Dulles was born on April 7, 1893, in Watertown, New York, one of five children of Presbyterian minister Allen Macy Dulles, and his wife, Edith ( Foster) Dulles. He was five years younger than his brother, John Foster Dulles, Dwight D. Eisenhower's secretary of state and chairman and senior partner of Sullivan & Cromwell, and two years older than his sister, diplomat, Eleanor Lansing Dulles. His maternal grandfather, John W. Foster, was secretary of state under Benjamin Harrison, while his uncle by marriage, Robert Lansing was secretary of state under Woodrow Wilson. Dulles was uncle to Catholic convert Avery Dulles, a Jesuit priest and cardinal of the Catholic Church, who taught theology at Fordham University from 1988 to 2008.

Dulles graduated from Princeton University, where he participated in the American Whig–Cliosophic Society, and entered the diplomatic service in 1916. In 1920, he married Martha "Clover" Todd (March 5, 1894 – April 15, 1974). They had three children: daughters Clover "Toddy" (Mrs.) Jebsen and Joan (Mrs. Buresch, formerly Molden),
and son Allen Macy Dulles II (1930–2020), who was wounded and permanently disabled in the Korean War and spent the rest of his life in and out of medical care. According to his sister, Eleanor, Dulles had "at least a hundred" extramarital affairs, including some during his tenure with the CIA.

In 1921, while at the US Embassy in Istanbul, he helped expose the Protocols of the Elders of Zion as a forgery. Dulles unsuccessfully attempted to persuade the US State Department to publicly denounce the forgery.

Early career 
Initially assigned to Vienna, he was transferred to Bern, Switzerland, along with the rest of the embassy personnel shortly before the U.S. entered the First World War. Later in life Dulles said he had been telephoned by Vladimir Lenin, seeking a meeting with the American embassy on April 8, 1917, the day before Lenin left Switzerland to travel to Saint Petersburg aboard a German train. After recovering from the Spanish flu he was assigned to the American delegation at the Paris Peace Conference, along with his elder brother Foster. From 1922 to 1926, he served five years as chief of the Near East division of the Department of State.

In 1926, he earned a law degree from George Washington University Law School and took a job at Sullivan & Cromwell, the New York firm where his brother, John Foster Dulles, was a partner. He became a director of the Council on Foreign Relations in 1927, the first new director since the Council's founding in 1921. He was the Council's secretary from 1933 to 1944, and its president from 1946 to 1950. 

During the late 1920s and early 1930s, he served as legal adviser to the delegations on arms limitation at the League of Nations. There he had the opportunity to meet with Adolf Hitler, Benito Mussolini, Soviet Foreign Minister Maxim Litvinov, and the leaders of Britain and France. In April 1933, Dulles and Norman Davis met with Hitler in Berlin on State Department duty. After the meeting, Dulles wrote to his brother Foster, reassuring him that conditions under Hitler's regime "are not quite as bad" as an alarmist friend had indicated. Dulles rarely spoke about his meeting with Hitler, and future CIA director Richard Helms hadn't even heard of their encounter until decades after the death of Dulles, expressing shock that his former boss had never told him about it. After meeting with Nazi propaganda minister Joseph Goebbels, Dulles stated he was impressed with him, citing his "sincerity and frankness" during their interaction.

In 1935, Dulles returned from a business trip to Germany concerned by the Nazi treatment of German Jews and, despite his brother's objections, led a movement within the law firm of Sullivan & Cromwell to close their Berlin office. As a result of Dulles's efforts, the Berlin office was closed and the firm ceased to conduct business in Nazi Germany.

As the Republican Party began to divide into isolationist and interventionist factions, Dulles became an outspoken interventionist, running unsuccessfully in 1938 for the Republican nomination in New York's Sixteenth Congressional District on a platform calling for the strengthening of U.S. defenses. Dulles collaborated with Hamilton Fish Armstrong, the editor of Foreign Affairs magazine, on two books, Can We Be Neutral? (1936), and Can America Stay Neutral? (1939). They concluded that diplomatic, military, and economic isolation, in a traditional sense, were no longer possible in an increasingly interdependent international system. Dulles helped some German Jews, such as the banker Paul Kemper, escape to the United States from Nazi Germany.

OSS posting to Bern, Switzerland, in World War II 
Dulles was recruited into the Office of Strategic Services by William J. Donovan in October 1941, after the outbreak of the Second World War in Europe, and on November 12, 1942, he moved to Bern, Switzerland, where he lived at Herrengasse 23 for the duration of World War II. As Swiss Director of the OSS, Dulles worked on intelligence about German plans and activities, and established wide contacts with German émigrés, resistance figures, and anti-Nazi intelligence officers. He was assisted in intelligence-gathering activities by Gero von Schulze-Gaevernitz, a German emigrant. Dulles also received valuable information from Fritz Kolbe, a German diplomat, one whom he described as the best spy of the war. Kolbe supplied secret documents about active German spies and plans for the Messerschmitt Me 262 jet fighter.

Dulles was in contact with the Austrian resistance group around the priest Heinrich Maier, who collected information through many different contacts with scientists and the military. From 1943 onwards, he received very important information from this resistance group about V-1, V-2 rockets, Tiger tanks, Messerschmitt Bf 109, Messerschmitt Me 163 Komet and other aircraft and the related factories. Allied bombers were thus able to target war-decisive armaments factories. In particular, Dulles then had crucial information for Operation Crossbow and Operation Hydra. The group reported to him about the mass murder in Auschwitz. Through the Maier Group and Kurt Grimm, Dulles also received information about the economic situation in the Nazi sphere of influence. After the resistance group was uncovered by the Gestapo, Dulles sent American agents to Austria to contact any surviving members.

Although Washington barred Dulles from making firm commitments to the plotters of the 20 July 1944 attempt to assassinate Hitler, the conspirators nonetheless gave him reports on developments in Germany, including sketchy but accurate warnings of plans for Hitler's V-1 and V-2 missiles.

Dulles was involved in Operation Sunrise, secret negotiations in March 1945 to arrange a local surrender of German forces in northern Italy. His actions in Operation Sunrise have been criticized by historians for offering German SS General Karl Wolff protection from prosecution at the Nuremberg trial, and creating a diplomatic rift between the U.S. and U.S.S.R. After the war in Europe, Dulles served for six months as the OSS Berlin station chief and later as station chief in Bern. The Office of Strategic Services was dissolved in October 1945 and its functions transferred to the State and War Departments.

In 1947, Dulles served as a senior staffer on the Herter Committee.

In the 1948 Presidential election, Dulles was, together with his brother, an advisor to Republican nominee Thomas E. Dewey. The Dulles brothers and James Forrestal helped form the Office of Policy Coordination. During 1949 he co-authored the Dulles–Jackson–Correa Report, which was sharply critical of the Central Intelligence Agency, which had been established by the National Security Act of 1947. Partly as a result of the report, Truman named a new Director of Central Intelligence, Lieutenant General Walter Bedell Smith.

CIA career 

DCI Smith recruited Dulles to oversee the agency's covert operations as Deputy Director for Plans, a position he held from January 4, 1951. On August 23, 1951, Dulles was promoted to Deputy Director of Central Intelligence, second in the intelligence hierarchy. In this capacity, in 1952–53 he was one of five members of the State Department Panel of Consultants on Disarmament during the last year of the Truman administration.

After the election of Dwight Eisenhower in 1952, Bedell Smith shifted to the Department of State and Dulles became the first civilian Director of Central Intelligence. Dulles played a role in convincing Eisenhower to follow one of the conclusions of the State Department Panel report, that the American public deserved to be informed of the perils of possible nuclear war with the Soviet Union, because even though America held numerical nuclear superiority, the Soviets would still have enough nuclear weapons to severely damage American society regardless of how many more such bombs the United States might possess or how badly those U.S. weapons could destroy the Soviets.

The Agency's covert operations were an important part of the Eisenhower administration's new Cold War national security policy known as the "New Look".

At Dulles's request, President Eisenhower demanded that Senator Joseph McCarthy discontinue issuing subpoenas against the CIA. In March 1950, McCarthy had initiated a series of investigations into potential communist subversion of the Agency. Although none of the investigations revealed any wrongdoing, the hearings were potentially damaging, not only to the CIA's reputation but also to the security of sensitive information. Documents made public in 2004 revealed that the CIA, under Dulles's orders, had broken into McCarthy's Senate office and fed disinformation to him in order to discredit him, in order to stop his investigation of communist infiltration of the CIA.In the early 1950s, the United States Air Force conducted a competition for a new photo reconnaissance aircraft. Lockheed Aircraft Corporation's Skunk Works submitted a design number called the CL-282, which married sailplane-like wings to the body of a supersonic interceptor. This aircraft was rejected by the Air Force, but several of the civilians on the review board took notice, and Edwin Land presented a proposal for the aircraft to Dulles. The aircraft became what is known as the U-2 'spy plane', and it was initially operated by CIA pilots. Its introduction into operational service in 1957 greatly enhanced the CIA's ability to monitor Soviet activity through overhead photo surveillance. The aircraft eventually entered service with the Air Force. The Soviet Union shot down and captured a U-2 in 1960 during Dulles's term as CIA chief.

Dulles is considered one of the essential creators of the modern United States intelligence system and was an indispensable guide to clandestine operations during the Cold War. He established intelligence networks worldwide to check and counter Soviet and eastern European communist advances as well as international communist movements.

Coup in Iran 
In 1953, Dulles was involved, along with Frank Wisner, in Operation Ajax, the covert operation that led to the removal of democratically elected prime minister of Iran, Mohammad Mossadegh, and his replacement with Mohammad Reza Pahlavi, Shah of Iran. Rumors of a Soviet takeover of the country had surfaced due to the nationalization of the Anglo-Iranian Oil Company. By bizarre coincidence, on 18 August 1953 Dulles was taking a personal vacation in Rome while the Shah fled there after a setback in the coup, and the two met while checking in to the Hotel Excelsior. The meeting turned out to be fortuitous for the United States and the coup. CIA and independent historians say that the meeting was happenstance, but conspiracy theories abound.

Coup in Guatemala 
President Jacobo Arbenz Guzman of Guatemala was removed in 1954 in a CIA-led coup carried out under the code name Operation PBSuccess.

Eduardo Galeano described Dulles as a former member of the United Fruit Company's Board of Directors. However, in a detailed examination of the connections between the United Fruit Company and the Eisenhower Administration, Immerman makes no mention of Dulles being part of the United Fruit Company's Board, although he does note that Sullivan & Cromwell had represented the company.

Bay of Pigs 
Several failed assassination plots utilizing CIA-recruited operatives and anti-Castro Cubans directly against Castro undermined the CIA's credibility. The reputation of the agency and its director declined drastically after the Bay of Pigs Invasion fiasco of 1961. President Kennedy reportedly said he wanted to "splinter the CIA into a thousand pieces and scatter it into the winds." However, following a "rigorous inquiry into the agency's affairs, methods, and problems ... [Kennedy] did not 'splinter' it after all and did not recommend Congressional supervision. Instead, President Kennedy transferred the CIA to the Department of Defense under the close supervision and control of the Joint Chiefs of Staff which would also report on CIA plans and operations to the President."

Dismissal 

During the Kennedy Administration, Dulles faced increasing criticism. In autumn 1961, following the Bay of Pigs incident and the Algiers putsch against Charles de Gaulle, Dulles and his entourage, including Deputy Director for Plans Richard M. Bissell Jr. and Deputy Director Charles Cabell, were forced to resign. On November 28, 1961, Kennedy presented Dulles with the National Security Medal at the CIA Headquarters in Langley, Virginia. The next day, November 29, the White House released a resignation letter signed by Dulles. He was replaced by John McCone.

Later life 
On November 29, 1963, President Lyndon Baines Johnson appointed Dulles as one of seven commissioners of the Warren Commission to investigate the assassination of the U.S. President John F. Kennedy. The appointment was later criticized by some historians, who have noted that Kennedy had fired him, and he was therefore unlikely to be impartial in passing the judgments charged to the Warren Commission. In the view of journalist and author Stephen Kinzer, Johnson appointed Dulles primarily so that Dulles could "coach" the Commission on how to interview CIA witnesses and what questions to ask, because Johnson and Dulles were both anxious to ensure that the Commission did not discover Kennedy's secret involvement in the administration's illegal plans to assassinate Castro and other foreign leaders. Robert F. Kennedy also urged Lyndon Johnson to put Allen Dulles on the Warren Commission most likely fearing Kennedy's clandestine involvement in Cuba.

In 1966, Princeton University's American Whig-Cliosophic Society awarded Dulles the James Madison Award for Distinguished Public Service.

Dulles published the book The Craft of Intelligence in 1963, and edited Great True Spy Stories in 1968.

He died on January 29, 1969, of influenza, complicated by pneumonia, at the age of 75, in Georgetown, D.C. He was buried in Green Mount Cemetery in Baltimore, Maryland.

Fictional portrayals 
Liberation (1970–71), a multinational fictional film series that shows Dulles in a photograph torn apart by Joseph Stalin in Film IV: The Battle of Berlin.
Seventeen Moments of Spring (1973), a Soviet television miniseries in which Vyacheslav Salevich depicts Dulles's role in Operation Sunrise during World War II.
In the Blackford Oakes novels (1976–2005), a spy series written by William F. Buckley Jr., Dulles is portrayed in several books, acting in his role as director of the CIA.
JFK (1991), a film that depicts Jim Garrison, a New Orleans District Attorney, as suspecting Dulles as a participant in the cover-up surrounding Kennedy's assassination and attempts to subpoena him.
The Commission (2003), a fictional film that depicts Dulles, played by Jack Betts, as a participant in the Warren Commission and investigator into the Kennedy assassination.
The Good Shepherd (2006), a fictional film in which William Hurt portrays the fictional head of the CIA, Phillip Allen, who appears to be based on Dulles.
The Company (2007), an American miniseries based on the novel The Company: A Novel of the CIA (2002) by American novelist Robert Littell.
The Honor of Spies (2009) in the Honor Bound series and also the Men At War series, a novel series written by W.E.B. Griffin and his son. Dulles is portrayed as part of the European Head of the OSS and the Swiss Agent in Charge respectively.
Nick and Jake (2012), a novel co-written by Tad Richards and Jonathan Richards and published by Arcade Publishing. Allen Dulles is depicted as plotting a coup to overthrow the government of France.
The FX cartoon comedy Archer mentions Dulles in a 2012 episode while discussing Operation Gladio, as well as in a 2016 episode centered around Project MKUltra.
Bridge of Spies (2015), a movie about the exchange of Rudolf Abel and Francis Gary Powers, depicts a conversation between James B. Donovan (portrayed by Tom Hanks) and Dulles (portrayed by Peter McRobbie).

Publications

Articles 
 "The Power of the President Over Foreign Affairs." Michigan Law Review, vol. 14, no. 6 (Apr. 1, 1916), pp. 470–478. University of Michigan Law School. . .
 "New Uses for the Machinery for the Settlement of International Disputes: Discussion." Proceedings of the Academy of Political Science, vol. 13, no. 2 (1929), pp. 100–104. . .

Book reviews

Books 
 

 

 

 The Marshall Plan. Co-authored by Michael Wala. Providence, RI: Berg, 1993. 

 

 

 

 Talbot, David (2015). Devil's Chessboard: Allen Dulles, the CIA, and the Rise of America's Secret Government (Harper Collins)

Books edited 
 Great True Spy Stories. New York: Harper & Row (1968).

Book contributions 
 Foreword to To the Bitter End: An Insider's Account of the Plot to Kill Hitler, by Hans B. Gisevius. New York: Da Capo Press (1998). .

See also 
 John Foster Dulles

References

Bibliography 

 
 
 
 
 
 
 
 
 

 

 
 Petersen, Neal H. ed. From Hitler's Doorstep: The Wartime Intelligence Reports of Allen Dulles 1942-1945 (Penn State University Press, 1995)
 Poulgrain, Greg. JFK Vs. Allen Dulles: Battleground Indonesia (Simon and Schuster, 2020).

 
 

 Wardaya, Baskara T. "The Long Shadow of the Cold War: The Cold War Policies of the United States towards Asia and their Impact on Indonesia." International Quarterly for Asian Studies 52.3-4 (2021): 331-347.

Further reading 
 Hastings, Max (2015). The Secret War: Spies, Codes and Guerrillas, 1939–1945. London: William Collins. 
 Peyrefitte, Alain (2011). C'etait de Gaulle. Distribooks. 
 Sharp, Tony (2014). Stalin's American Spy: Noel Field, Allen Dulles and the East European Show-Trials. Hurst. 
 Talbot, David (2015). The Devil's Chessboard: Allen Dulles, the CIA, and the Rise of America's Secret Government. HarperCollins. 
 von Lingen, Kerstin (2013). Allen Dulles, the OSS, and Nazi War Criminals: The Dynamics of Selective Prosecution. Cambridge University Press.

External links 
Allen Dulles at Find a Grave
Allen Dulles at Open Library
Allen Dulles at WorldCat

Works available online
Works by Allen Dulles at Internet Archive
Works by Allen Dulles at Foreign Affairs
Works by Allen Dulles at JSTOR
Works by Allen Dulles at Online Books Page

Archival materials
References to Allen Dulles at Central Intelligence Agency
Personal papers at the Seeley G. Mudd Manuscript Library at Princeton University
FBI file on Allen Dulles
“The Role of Intelligence in Policy Making” (RAM). Audio recording of a lecture given by Dulles.

|-

|-

1893 births
1969 deaths
American anti-communists
American spies
World War II spies for the United States
Burials at Green Mount Cemetery
Deputy Directors of the Central Intelligence Agency
Directors of the Central Intelligence Agency
Dulles family
George Washington University Law School alumni
Guatemalan Revolution 
Members of the Warren Commission
New York (state) lawyers
New York (state) Republicans
People of the Congo Crisis
People of the Office of Strategic Services
Presidents of the Council on Foreign Relations 
Princeton University alumni
Project MKUltra
Rockefeller Center
Phillips Exeter Academy alumni
Deaths from influenza
Sullivan & Cromwell partners